The Californias, occasionally known as The Three Californias or Two Californias, are a region of North America spanning the United States and Mexico, consisting of the U.S. state of California and the Mexican states of Baja California and Baja California Sur. Historically, the term Californias was used to define the vast northwestern region of Spanish America, as the Province of the Californias, and later as a collective term for Alta California and the Baja California Peninsula.

Originally a single, vast entity within the Spanish Empire, as the Californias became defined in their geographical limits, their administration was split various times into Baja California (Lower California) and Alta California (Upper California), especially during the Mexican control of the region, following the Mexican War of Independence. As a part of the Mexican–American War (1846–48), the American Conquest of Alta California saw the vast Alta California territory ceded from Mexico to the United States. The populated coastal region of the territory was admitted into the Union in 1850 as the State of California, while the vast, sparsely populated interior region would only later gain statehood as Nevada, Utah, and parts of Arizona, Wyoming, and Colorado.

Today, Californias is a collective term to refer to the American and Mexican states bearing the name California, which share geography, history, cultures, and strong economic ties.

Etymology

There has been understandable confusion about use of the plural Californias by Spanish colonial authorities. California historian Theodore Hittell offered the following explanation:

History
The first attempted Spanish occupation of California was by the Jesuit missionary Eusebio Kino, in 1683. His Misión San Bruno failed, however, and it was not until 1697 that Misión de Nuestra Señora de Loreto Conchó was successfully established by another Jesuit, Juan María de Salvatierra. The mission became the nucleus of Loreto, first permanent settlement and first administrative center of the province. The Jesuits went on to found a total of 18 missions in the lower two-thirds of the Baja California Peninsula.

Province of New Spain

In 1767, the Jesuits were expelled from the missions, and Franciscans were brought in to take over. Gaspar de Portolá was appointed governor to supervise the transition. At the same time, a new visitador, José de Gálvez, was dispatched from Spain with authority to organize and expand the fledgling province.

The more ambitious province name, Las Californias, was established by a joint dispatch to the King from Viceroy de Croix and visitador José de Gálvez, dated January 28, 1768. Gálvez sought to make a distinction between the Antigua ('old') area of established settlement and the Nueva ('new') unexplored areas to the north.

The single province was divided in 1804, into Alta California province and Baja California province. By the time of the 1804 split, the Alta province had expanded to include coastal areas as far north as what is now the San Francisco Bay Area in the U.S. state of California. Expansion came through exploration and colonization expeditions led by Portolá (1769), his successor Pedro Fages (1770), Juan Bautista de Anza (1774–76), the Franciscan missionaries and others. Independent Mexico retained the division but demoted the former provinces to territories, due to populations too small for statehood.

Department of Mexico

In 1836, the designation Las Californias was revived, reuniting Alta and Baja California into a single departamento (department) as part of the conservative government reforms codified in the Siete Leyes (Seven Laws). The Seven Laws were repealed in 1847, during the Mexican–American War, and the split of the two Californias was restored.

California briefly achieved independence after the Bear Flag Revolt but quickly came under the occupation of American forces.

Following Mexico's defeat in the war, most of the former Alta California territory was ceded on 2 February 1848 to the United States, under the terms of the Treaty of Guadalupe Hidalgo. The areas in North America acquired by the U.S. were designated as unorganized "territory" under a military governor, pending re-establishment of civilian control and organization. California was the first section of the territory to achieve statehood, two years later.

Geography
The Baja California Peninsula is bordered on three sides by water, the Pacific Ocean (south and west) and Gulf of California (east); while Alta California had the Pacific Ocean on the west and deserts on the east. A northern boundary was established by the Adams–Onís Treaty of 1819. That boundary line remains the northern boundary of the U.S. states of California, Nevada, and the western part of Utah.

Inland regions were mostly unexplored by the Spanish, leaving them generally outside the control of the colonial authorities. Mountain ranges of the Peninsular Ranges, eastern Transverse Ranges, and the Sierra Nevada, along with the arid Colorado Desert, Mojave Desert, and Great Basin Desert in their eastern rain shadows, served as natural barriers to Spanish settlement. The eastern border of upper Las Californias was never officially defined under either Spanish or subsequent Mexican rule. The 1781 Instrucciones and government correspondence described Alta California ("Upper California") as the areas to the west of the Sierra Nevada and the lower part of the Colorado River in the Lower Colorado River Valley (the river forms the present day border between the states of California and Arizona).

See also

 List of governors in the Viceroyalty of New Spain
 Spanish missions in Baja California
 Spanish missions in California
 Indigenous peoples of California
 Population of Native California
 Indigenous peoples of Baja California
 Ranchos of California
 History of California
 History of California through 1899
 Territorial evolution of California
 Spanish colonization of the Americas
The Canadas
The Carolinas
The Dakotas
The Floridas
The Virginias

References

Further reading

External links
 Worldstatesmen.org: Provinces of New Spain

 
Regions of North America
Californias
Californias
Californias
Californias
Californias
Californias
Californias
Californias
Californias
Californias
Californias
Californias